The Liechtenstein Davis Cup team represents Liechtenstein in Davis Cup tennis competition and is governed by the Liechtensteiner Tennisverband. Liechtenstein currently compete in the Europe Zone Group IV. They did not compete in 1999, 2001 and between 2002-2013.

History
Liechtenstein competed in its first Davis Cup in 1996.  Their best result was seventh-eighth Group III in 2017.

Current team (2022) 

 Gian-Carlo Besimo
 Andrej Spasojevic (Junior player)
 Eric Peppard

Statistics
Last updated: Liechtenstein - Latvia; 7 April 2018

Record
Total: 17–29 (36.9%)

Head-to-head record (1996–)

Record against continents

Record by decade
1996–1999: 5–10 (33.3%) 
2000–2009: 3–7 (30.0%)
2010–2019: 9–12 (42.9%)

See also
Davis Cup
Liechtenstein Fed Cup team

External links

Davis Cup teams
Davis Cup
Davis Cup